Futebol Clube de Felgueiras was a Portuguese football club from Felgueiras. The club was founded on 16 August 1936 and ended in 2005 due to financial problems. The club played at the Estádio Dr. Machado de Matos which was their home since the club was founded in the 1930s. José Fonte and former Portuguese international footballers Fernando Meira and Sérgio Conceição are one of the most famous players to ever play for Felgueiras. Bakero played there in his youth.

History
During a good portion of the 1980s, FC Felgueiras participated regularly in national championships. In the 1982–83 season, it got its first major national stint, after winning the Second Division and therefore achieving promotion.

In 1991–92, under the command of Mário Reis, Felgueiras won the Second Division northern zone league, again reaching the second level. It was also during that decade that the club under the management of Jorge Jesus reached the pinnacle of its sporting achievements, being promoted to the top flight. In the 1995–96 Primeira Divisão the club finished sixteenth place and were relegated. The club then suffered a hefty decline down the football pyramid that lead them to the regional leagues and eventually extinction. A new football club, F.C. Felgueiras 1932 was created in 2006 and achieved promotion to the Terceira Divisão in the 2011–12 season.

Honours
 Taça de Honra do Porto: 1
 1984–85

League and Cup history

References

External links
FC Felgueiras official Facebook page
Zerozero.pt team profile
ForaDeJogo.net profile

Football clubs in Portugal
Association football clubs established in 1936
Association football clubs disestablished in 2005
1936 establishments in Portugal
2005 disestablishments in Portugal
F.C. Felgueiras
Primeira Liga clubs
Liga Portugal 2 clubs